The Runnemede Public School District is a community public school district that serves students in pre-kindergarten through eighth grade from Runnemede, in Camden County, New Jersey, United States.

As of the 2018–19 school year, the district, comprising three schools, had an enrollment of 814 students and 68.5 classroom teachers (on an FTE basis), for a student–teacher ratio of 11.9:1.

The district is classified by the New Jersey Department of Education as being in District Factor Group "B", the second-lowest of eight groupings. District Factor Groups organize districts statewide to allow comparison by common socioeconomic characteristics of the local districts. From lowest socioeconomic status to highest, the categories are A, B, CD, DE, FG, GH, I and J.

For ninth through twelfth grades, public school students attend Triton Regional High School, which also serves students from Bellmawr Borough and Gloucester Township, as one of three high schools that are part of the Black Horse Pike Regional School District. As of the 2018–19 school year, the high school had an enrollment of 1,159 students and 95.5 classroom teachers (on an FTE basis), for a student–teacher ratio of 12.1:1. The two other schools in the district are Highland Regional High School and Timber Creek Regional High School, which serve students from Gloucester Township, based on their address.

Schools
Schools in the district (with 2018–19 enrollment data from the National Center for Education Statistics) are:
Elementary schools
Aline Bingham Elementary School with 174 students in grades K-3
Jade Yezzi, Principal
Grace Downing Elementary School with 167 students in grades K-3
Jade Yezzi, Principal
Middle school
Mary E. Volz Elementary and Middle School with 469 students in grades 4-8
Steve Pili, Principal
Phil Silva, Vice Principal

Administration
Core members of the district's administration are:
Mark Iannucci, Superintendent
Dr. Sean R. McCarron, Business Administrator / Board Secretary

Board of education
The district's board of education, with nine members, sets policy and oversees the fiscal and educational operation of the district through its administration. As a Type II school district, the board's trustees are elected directly by voters to serve three-year terms of office on a staggered basis, with three seats up for election each year held (since 2012) as part of the November general election. The board appoints a superintendent to oversee the day-to-day operation of the district.

References

External links
Runnemede Public School District

School Data for the Runnemede Public School District, National Center for Education Statistics
Black Horse Pike Regional School District

Runnemede, New Jersey
New Jersey District Factor Group B
School districts in Camden County, New Jersey